Pheidippides was an ancient Greek runner.

Pheidippides can also refer to:

Phidippides cardiomyopathy, cardiomyopathic changes that occur after long periods of endurance training
42585 Pheidippides, an asteroid
a comic character in The Clouds

See also
Philippides (disambiguation)